Bishop Singleton T. Jones (March 8, 1825 – April 18, 1891) was a religious leader in the African Methodist Episcopal Zion Church (AME Zion). When he was ten years old, he was apprenticed to a lawyer and worked for him for four years, after which he found positions at an inn, as a hod carrier, and on a riverboat on the Ohio River. He became a pastor in the 1840s, serving churches throughout Pennsylvania, New Jersey, Maryland, and the District of Columbia. Although he had little education, the taught himself to be an articulate orator. Besides being a pastor to churches, he also edited AME Zion publications, the Zion's Standard and Weekly Review and the Discipline.

He helped establish churches before and after the Civil War and was known for his skills for helping blacks adjust to the post-war Reconstruction era. He became a bishop of the church in 1868. He and his wife had twelve children, two of whom attained a higher education, and their son Edward D. W. Jones sought a career with the AME Zion Church, becoming a bishop as well. He wrote several hymns and his sermons and addresses were published a year after his death.

He was the first of the African American clergy to be awarded an honorary Doctor of Divinity and was listed with Harriet Tubman as one of the most effective church members to understand and meet the needs of African Americans.

Early life
Singleton Thomas Webster Jones was born in Wrightsville, Pennsylvania on March 8, 1825. His parents were William H. and Catherine Jones from the Eastern Shore of Maryland. Catherine was born in the town of Liberty.

He was apprenticed to a lawyer, Thomas Kelly, at York, Pennsylvania at the age of ten. He worked on the farm, in the house, and as a cart boy until 1839, when he was released from the service. He then left for Philadelphia to find work, but he was unsuccessful. He continued on foot to Harrisburg where he found employment at the Temperance House Inn. He attended the Wesley Union AME Zion Church, led by Rev. George Galbreath, who had baptized him when he was two years old. He worked as a hod carrier with Rev. John E. Price in Harrisburg. He also worked on a boat on the Ohio River.

Career

Overview
He was licensed to preach in 1846. He joined the Allegheny Conference on August 23, 1849. He was ordained deacon in August 1850. In 1851, he received elders' orders. He transferred to the Baltimore Conference in May 1853. In 1857 he was ordained elder by Bishop Galbreath. He served in the New York Conference in 1857, the Philadelphia Conference in 1859, the New York Conference in 1864, returning to the Baltimore Conference in June 1866.

On May 19, 1868, he was elected bishop May 19, 1868, and was consecrated May 31.  He last served the Mother African Methodist Episcopal Zion Church (Old Zion church) in New York. He was the first African American to receive an honorary Doctor of Divinity from a reputable college.

Churches

He served churches throughout Pennsylvania, Baltimore, Washington, and New Jersey. Jones was the pastor of the Zion Wesley A.M.E. Zion Church in Southwest Washington, D.C. by 1843. He established a mission, for what in nine years became the Galbraith African Methodist Episcopal Zion Church, in northwest Washington in 1843.

After the Civil War, church leaders traveled into the southern states to spread the word to African Americans about the black-led African Methodist Episcopal Zion Church. Jones went into the southwest. Jones was noted for his ability to help his Harrisburg congregants manage the post-war challenges:

He, with Harriet Tubman were identified as two people from the Church who best understood the needs of African Americans and offered wholesome and worthwhile contributions. Jones was the Presiding Bishop of the Missouri Conference when the Jones Tabernacle African Methodist Episcopal Zion Church in Indianapolis, Indiana was named after him in 1872. The church was subsequently destroyed by fire. A historical marker indicates the location of the former church at North and Blackford Streets.

Editor
Jones was a founder and the editor of the Zion's Standard and Weekly Review, the second newspaper published by the Zion Church, which was a "pioneer in the movement for abolition of human slavery." At the time, he was the pastor of the Bleecker Street church and before he became a bishop. In the late 1850s, William H. Day contributed poems and was an editor for the newspaper. Jones was tasked to begin editing the Discipline in 1856.

Works

Personal life

On November 29, 1846, Jones married Mary J. Talbot, or Talbert, of Allegheny, Pennsylvania. Her parents were Edward and Jane Talbert. Their children were George Galbreth, Chester Stevens, Ann Catherine, David Eddie, Elizabeth Jane, Mary Ann, Singleton Thomas, William Haywodd Bishop, Alice Williamson, Joll Robinson, Jennie Catherine, and Edward Derussa William Jones. Both Jennie and Edward graduated from Livingstone College. His son, Edward D. W. Jones (1871–1935) was a bishop of the John Wesley AMEZ Church. In addition to serving as clergy, he was also editor of Comprehensive Catechism.

Jones was an accomplished organist. He died at 1019 19th Street N.W. in Washington, D.C. on April 18, 1891. He was still in active service at the time of his death. His funeral was held at the John Wesley Church, now the National Church of Zion Methodism. His wife, Mary J. Jones died in Washington, D.C. on July 14, 1895. She was said to have been a prominent member of the church.

References

External links
 Online Books by Singleton T. Jones
 Hymns by Singleton T. Jones

1825 births
1891 deaths
American Methodist bishops
African Methodist Episcopal Zion Church bishops
African-American religious leaders
People from York County, Pennsylvania
African-American publishers (people)
African-American abolitionists
19th-century Methodist bishops
19th-century American clergy